The Aston Martin Vulcan is a two-door, two-seat, high-performance lightweight track-only car launched in 2015 by British luxury automobile manufacturer Aston Martin at the 2015 Geneva Motor Show.

The Vulcan was designed by Aston Martin's creative officer Marek Reichman, taking inspiration from the then Aston Martin current models, such as the Vantage, the DB9 and the One-77. Production totalled 24 cars, with each priced at US$2.3 million. One was included with the penthouse of Aston Martin Residences tower in Miami.

Specifications
The Vulcan is fitted with a magnesium torque tube which has a carbon fibre propeller shaft, a limited-slip differential and an Xtrac 6-speed sequential transmission. It uses Michelin Pilot Sport Cup 2 tires, which are fitted on 19 inch APP-TECH wheels that feature centerlock design. 
Stopping power is aided courtesy of carbon-ceramic brakes, which measure  at the front,  at the rear, and are produced by Brembo.

The Vulcan generates GT3-car levels of downforce via its prominent front splitter, rear diffuser and adjustable rear wing.

The car has a race-derived pushrod suspension with anti-dive geometry and is complemented by Multimatic’s Dynamic Suspension Spool Valve (DSSV) adjustable dampers and anti-roll bars, front and rear driver-adjustable anti-lock braking, and variable traction control.

Like the Ferrari FXX, 599XX, FXX-K, and the McLaren P1 GTR, the Vulcan must be approved to drive on track day events by the factory. However, unlike those cars, customers can keep the car on their own.

Vulcan AMR Pro package 
The AMR Pro package for the Vulcan was unveiled at the 2017 Goodwood Festival of Speed. The package contains extra aerodynamic pieces to enhance the performance of the car, with the presence of an enhanced dual-element rear wing with a Gurney flap, large dive planes, side wheel arch louvres, and turning vanes designed to improve steering response. These improvements allow the car's downforce performance to increase by 27%. Balance has been improved as well, with a 47/53 weight distribution, due to the majority of the pressure going towards the centre of the car.

The car still has the same 7.0-litre naturally-aspirated V12 engine as the standard Vulcan, with the power output being unchanged. The 6-speed transmission is also retained unchanged, but shorter final driver ratio is used in order to improve acceleration.

All existing cars can be fitted with the AMR Pro package by the Aston Martin Q division at the owner's request.

Road-legal conversion 
An Aston Martin Vulcan was made road-legal by British engineering company RML Group through a series of modifications. This car remains the only Vulcan to be made legal for the road. Several changes had to be performed in order to meet road regulations. The group took 18 months to modify the entire car.

The ride height of the car is raised for ground clearance. The rear LED "blades" are covered with a plastic light housing for radius management. Two front integrated headlights have been added, under the inspiration of the modern Aston Martin design. The styling of the lights mimic the factory lights of the Vulcan. As for the front splitter, the car's fences, placed on the side of the aerodynamic piece for more downforce, have been removed, and the length of the carbon fibre splitter has also been shortened.

The 7.0-litre naturally-aspirated V12 is remapped for emissions, and the cooling system is replaced with a different unit for better temperature control although it retains its original power output rating. The car's gear ratios are altered, and the clutch was changed to make the launch easier than the regular Vulcan. Spring rates and damper rates have been changed, and ride height lifting has been added to allow for easier driving on the road. The steering lock became less limited to allow the car to steer more and give a smaller turning radius.

The Vulcan's side mirrors have been replaced in favour of the DB11's mirrors, since the regular Vulcan's mirror glass does not meet road regulations, and it does not include mirror-integrated indicators. All windows have been replaced with specific units that meet road regulations, and a windscreen wiper and washer jets have been added. The rear bumper has been modified to allow for a Euro-spec registration plate to be installed, along with plate lights, and a reflector. The rear wing plates' ends contain an amber light strip for direction indicators, and the fuel cap has been modified. As for the interior, the seats (which originally had head support) have been changed to allow for visibility, and the steering wheel has been drastically modified. The doors are central locking, and the car contains an immobiliser key.

According to RML, owners of this car can ask the group to revert the car to racing spec whenever the owner desires.

Motorsport
One example of the Vulcan was fielded in the 2022 British Endurance Championship in Class A (group GT3) class. It previously raced in the Britcar endurance championship as an invitational entry.

References

External links

Sports cars
Vulcan
Rear-wheel-drive vehicles
Cars introduced in 2015